Hutchins Franklin Inge (April 16, 1900 – March 28, 2002) was an American physician and Democratic Party politician. He was the first African American to serve in the New Jersey Senate.

Early life and career

Inge was born in Charlottesville, Virginia, in 1900 to George and Kate Ferguson Inge. In May 1921 at the University of Minnesota, Inge became a charter member of Xi chapter of Omega Psi Phi fraternity. He graduated from the University of Minnesota College of Pharmacy and Howard University College of Medicine.

Inge began his medical practice in Newark, New Jersey, in 1936. He served on the staff of United Presbyterian Hospital in Newark and was also staff physician for the Newark Board of Health's Division of Child Hygiene. He was director of the Essex Urban League and a founder of the Council of Doers, professional men dedicated to community service. He was also a life member of the NAACP and a member of the American Medical Association.

Political career

In 1965, at the age of 65, Inge was nominated by the Essex County Democratic organization as a candidate for the State Senate. He was one of four Senate candidates on the county slate, after a temporary reapportionment plan awarded Essex (as well as Bergen County) the right to elect four instead of one senators. All four Democratic candidates were elected to office, in a year when Governor Richard J. Hughes was reelected in a landslide and Democrats took control of both houses of the legislature.

1965 Essex County State Senator General Election Results

During Inge's tenure in the Senate from 1966 to 1968, he served as the chairman of the Senate Federal and Interstate Relations Committee. He was a supporter of measures to aid education, transportation, and housing.

Later life

In 1970 Inge married Dorothy E. Helme and moved to Osterville, Massachusetts, on Cape Cod. He continued his medical practice at his residence there until his retirement in 1995. His wife died on December 25, 1996, at the age of 82. Inge died on March 28, 2002, at the age of 101 at St. Luke's Hospital in New Bedford, Massachusetts, where he lived after his wife's death.

In 2007, Governor Jon Corzine signed a bill commemorating the achievements of Inge, along with Walter G. Alexander, the first African American to serve in the New Jersey General Assembly.

See also
List of African-American officeholders (1900–1959)

References

1900 births
2002 deaths
University of Minnesota College of Pharmacy alumni
Howard University alumni
Physicians from Newark, New Jersey
African-American state legislators in New Jersey
Democratic Party New Jersey state senators
Politicians from Charlottesville, Virginia
Politicians from Newark, New Jersey
People from Osterville, Massachusetts
20th-century American politicians
African-American centenarians
American centenarians
Men centenarians
20th-century African-American politicians
21st-century African-American people